The Bucharest Trophy is a pre-season international women's team handball tournament for clubs, held each year in Bucharest, Romania. The competition is hosted by Liga Naţională club CSM Bucharest at the Sala Polivalentă and governed by the rules and regulations of the IHF. It is currently contested by six teams. The event, inaugurated in 2014, is considered the most prestigious annual friendly tournament that takes place in Romania.

Tournaments

See also
Baia Mare Champions Trophy

References

External links 
 

 
CSM București (women's handball)
International handball competitions hosted by Romania
Sports competitions in Bucharest
Recurring sporting events established in 2014
2014 establishments in Romania
Women's handball in Romania